Joseph Michaud may refer to:
 Joseph-François Michaud (1767–1839), French historian and journalist
 Joseph-Enoil Michaud (1888–1967), New Brunswick lawyer and politician
 Joseph Michaud (Ontario politician) (1857–?), Canadian politician